The Order of the Equatorial Star is a state order of Gabon.

Instituted on 6 August 1959, it is awarded for personal merit and service to the nation, both civil and military. It has five grades: Grand Cross, Grand Officer, Commander, Officer and Knight.

Notable recipients

 
 
 
  (Grand Officer) (2009)

References 

Orders, decorations, and medals of Gabon
Awards established in 1959
1959 establishments in Africa
Orders of chivalry awarded to heads of state, consorts and sovereign family members